Leamon King (February 13, 1936 – May 23, 2001) was an American athlete who jointly held the world record for the 100-meter sprint for men from 1956 to 1960.

King, a graduate of the University of California, Berkeley, became joint holder of the record on October 20, 1956 in Ontario, California, with a time of 10.1 seconds, equal with Willie Williams and Ira Murchison, and repeated the time a week later in Santa Ana, California.  (In 1956, times were only recorded to the nearest tenth of a second.)  Ray Norton also recorded a time of 10.1 seconds in 1959.  The first person to run unambiguously faster in competition was Armin Hary in 1960.

He also jointly held the world 100 yard record with a time of 9.3 seconds.

King, along with Murchison, Thane Baker, and Bobby Morrow, won a gold medal at the 1956 Summer Olympics in Melbourne in the 4x100 metre relay.  He ran the second leg of the race.

After retiring from athletics, King returned to his job as a schoolteacher, living in Delano, California.  He had been a successful student athlete, breaking and making records, at Delano High School, making the finals at the CIF California State Meet in both the 100 yard dash and 220 yard dash each of his four years, winning the 100 once and the 220 twice.

References

1936 births
2001 deaths
American male sprinters
Athletes (track and field) at the 1956 Summer Olympics
California Golden Bears men's track and field athletes
Medalists at the 1956 Summer Olympics
Olympic gold medalists for the United States in track and field
Track and field athletes from California
People from Delano, California
USA Outdoor Track and Field Championships winners